Morado is a Spanish surname. Notable people with this surname include:
Jia Morado (born 1995), Filipina volleyball player
José Chávez Morado (1909-2002), Mexican artist
Tomás Chávez Morado (1914-2001), Mexican artist

Spanish-language surnames